The United States Senate Judiciary Subcommittee on Terrorism and Homeland Security is one of six subcommittees within the Senate Judiciary Committee.

Jurisdiction
The subcommittee's jurisdiction includes oversight of the Departments of Justice and Homeland Security and the State Department's consular operations with regard to anti-terrorism enforcement and policy. The jurisdiction also includes oversight of government encryption policies and encryption export licensing and oversight of espionage laws and their enforcement.

Members, 113th Congress
The subcommittee is chaired by Democrat Al Franken of Minnesota, and the Ranking Minority Member is Republican Jeff Flake of Arizona.

See also

U.S. House Judiciary Subcommittee on Courts, the Internet, and Intellectual Property
U.S. House Judiciary Subcommittee on Crime, Terrorism, and Homeland Security

References

External links
 Subcommittee on Terrorism and Homeland Security, official site

Judiciary Senate Terrorism and Homeland Security